The Bare-handed Pelota First League (Campeonato Manomanista) is the most important tournament competition of Hand-pelota category of Basque pelota. It was created in 1940, when the new Basque Pelota Spanish Federation, to have a champion of the category. In its beginnings, the championship was disputed every two years, turning into an annual tournament since 1950. The first champion was Atano III. Retegi II, holds the title of most wins with 11, 9 consecutives.

Until 1995 the competition system was stair, the winner of the past year was directly qualified to final and following him the other players in its last year respective positions, always maintaining the position earned in the last tournament. From 1995 to present, the system had several modifications that make it similar to a tennis tournament.
In the current competitions four semifinalists of last year are directly qualified to quarter finals. The winner is awarded with a txapela as a symboland a trophy.

Since 1957 its disputed also the Bare-handed Pelota Second League, for debutant and minor level pelotaris, that doesn't reach the level of professional pelota players, that consists of 2 or 3 games, played on weekends and holidays in frontons. the 2nd Hand-Pelota champion is allowed to participate in the next edition of 1st Hand-Pelota.

Championships

Winner pelotaris 

Basque pelota competitions
Sports leagues established in 1940